Tempest is a 1981 arcade game by Atari Inc., designed and programmed by Dave Theurer. It takes place on a three-dimensional surface divided into lanes, sometimes as a closed tube, and viewed from one end. The player controls a claw-shaped "blaster" that sits on the edge of the surface, snapping from segment to segment as a rotary knob is turned.

Tempest was one of the first games to use Atari's Color-QuadraScan vector display technology. It was also the first to let players choose their starting level (a system Atari called "SkillStep"). This feature increases the maximum starting level depending on the player's performance in the previous game, essentially allowing the player to continue the previous game. Tempest was one of the first video games with a progressive level design where the levels themselves varied rather than giving the player the same layout with increasing difficulty.

Gameplay

The goal in Tempest is to survive for as long as possible, and score as many points as possible, by clearing the screen of enemies that appear on the playing field. The player controls a blaster at the near end of the field, moving it left and right using a rotary knob. The player's blaster can rapid-fire shots down individual lanes of the field, destroying any enemies within the same lane. The blaster is also equipped with a "Superzapper" which, once per level, destroys all enemies currently on the field. A second use of the Superzapper in the same level destroys one random enemy, and the Superzapper is recharged between each level.

The game features sixteen unique levels of different shapes, including simple geometric shapes, a flat line, and the symbol for Infinity. Some levels are closed tubes that allow the player to loop throughout it continuously, while others have definite left and right endpoints. When all sixteen levels have been played, the sequence repeats with a different color scheme and higher difficulty. One set of levels (65 through 80) is "invisible" (black). After reaching Stage 99, the level counter stops increasing and each successive level shape is picked randomly.

Enemies first appear on the screen as swirling dots beyond the far end of the field, appearing on the field one at a time. There are seven types of enemies in the game, each with their own behavior pattern. Flippers attempt to catch the player's blaster and drag it to the far end of the playfield. Pulsars periodically electrify the lane that they occupy - if the blaster is in that lane at that moment, it is destroyed. Fuseballs jump forward and back unpredictably along the edges of each lane, moving slowly between them to give the player a brief opportunity to shoot them. Spikers roll toward the player and extend spikes into a lane, which the player can wear down by shooting it. After the first few levels, each level starts with short spikes at the far end of the field. Later levels also feature Fuseball and Pulsar Tankers, which split into two Fuseballs or two Pulsars when hit, respectively. Most enemies can shoot bullets at the blaster, destroying it upon impact.

When all enemies on the field have been destroyed, the player "warps" to the next level by traveling down the field and into the space beyond it. The player must avoid or destroy any spikes that are in the way - hitting one will destroy the blaster and force them to try the warp again.

The player loses a life when their blaster is destroyed or captured, and the game ends when all lives are lost. Bonus blasters (up to six at a time) are awarded at certain score intervals.

Development
The game was initially meant to be a first person remake of Space Invaders, but early versions had many problems, so a new design was used. Theurer says the design came from a nightmare where monsters crawled out of a hole in the ground. This led to him coming up with the design concept, stating he "basically just took Space Invaders and wrapped the surface into a circle," while monsters "come down the tunnel at you, out of the hole, and you [try] to kill them before they [get] out." During the prototype stages the game was called Aliens, then Vortex, and finally Tempest.

Three different cabinet designs exist for Tempest. The most common is an upright cabinet that, viewed from the side, is in the shape of a right triangle sitting on a rectangle. This cabinet sported colorful side art. A shorter, less flashy cabaret-style cabinet was also released with optional side art. A cocktail-style table cabinet allowed two players to play at opposite ends of the table; the screen automatically flipped for each player.

In the first games Atari shipped there were glitches in one or more of the ROM chips. The problem code allowed a player to do unintended things when ending their score in certain two-digit combinations. According to Joystik magazine, which detailed these combinations, the most useful were the ones that earned the player 40 free credits (06, 11, 12, 16, 17, 18) and the "jump to green" trick (46). Another useful combination mentioned was 05 which allowed the player to play the game in the attract mode. In this scenario pausing at one the combinations would cause the effect to take place immediately without losing the balance of the player's lives. Also, in the attract mode, pausing at an end score of 48 gave the player 255 extra lives. After this issue was discovered, Atari corrected the problem so that further shipping machines were incapable of allowing the end score tricks. It was also noted in Joystik that Atari shipped updated chips to be replaced in the field.

Ports
An official port was released for the Atari ST. An official port that bears the Atari logo was released by Superior Software for the BBC Micro and Acorn Electron in 1985, and another by Electric Dreams for the ZX Spectrum and Amstrad CPC in 1987. Versions for the Atari 2600 and 5200 were in the works in Atari, Inc. during 1984, and unfinished prototypes exist for both of them. The game was released for Microsoft Windows 3.x as part of the Microsoft Arcade package. It has 14 secret levels. The original Tempest was included as part of  Arcade's Greatest Hits: The Atari Collection 1 for the PlayStation, Sega Saturn, and Super NES. In 2001, Infogrames and Digital Eclipse ported 12 Atari arcade games (one of them being the original Tempest) under the compilation title Atari Anniversary Edition, released for PC and Dreamcast. A PlayStation compilation titled Atari Anniversary Edition Redux was also released with the same number of games plus two exclusives to the Redux edition. A handheld compilation, titled Atari Anniversary Advance, was released in 2002 for the Game Boy Advance with half the games of the console compilation, including Tempest. In 2005, the original Tempest is part of Atari Anthology for the Xbox and PlayStation 2; the PC version also includes the Atari 2600 prototype. The 2600 port was also released as part of the Atari Greatest Hits compilation for Nintendo DS and iOS devices. Also in 2005, a port and graphical "remix" of the original Tempest was included as part of Retro Atari Classics for the Nintendo DS. This version deviates significantly from the basic rules and experience of the original game. Tempest was released for Xbox 360 on December 19, 2007, which was available for purchase through Xbox Live Arcade for 400 MS Points. This version includes the original arcade game (emulated) and an "evolved" version with updated graphics.

After the unfinished Atari 5200 prototype was found in 1999, its original programmer, Keithen Hayenga, resumed work on finishing the port. It was published by AtariAge in 2013 for US$50.

Reception

Chris Crawford wrote in 1982 that unlike Pac-Man, Tempest "intimidates many beginners because it appears to be unwinnable"; its smoothly increasing difficulty, however, encourages players to continue playing. In 1995, Flux magazine ranked the game 6th on their Top 100 Video Games.  They lauded the game saying: "The best vector coin-up machine for white knuckle intensity, bar none, was Tempest." In 1996, Next Generation listed the arcade version as number 74 on their "Top 100 Games of All Time", commenting that "it's very fast, it has abstract, color vector graphics that remain unequaled to this day, and its novel 'paddle' controller makes playing Tempest effortless. The game's difficulty advances smoothly, and the play is extremely well balanced". Tempest is #10 on the KLOV's list of most popular games, tied with Centipede.

The game has been cited as an influence on the careers of video game designers Jeff Minter and John O'Neill. Atari co-founder Nolan Bushnell has said it is his favorite game to be published by the company.

Legacy
Shortly after the original game was released, an arcade owner named Duncan Brown hacked the level data and made an altered, more difficult version: Tempest Tubes. It was eventually included with Tempest in the Hasbro compilation Atari Arcade Hits: Volume 1 for PC in 1999.

Sequels
Jeff Minter created two authorized games, released long after the original game: Tempest 2000 (1994) for the Atari Jaguar (renamed Tempest X3 for the PlayStation port), and Tempest 3000 (2000) for Nuon enhanced DVD players. In July 2018, Tempest 4000 was released for multiple platforms. Minter also wrote two games inspired by Tempest: Space Giraffe (2007) and TxK (2014) After TxK was released for the PlayStation Vita, the current incarnation of Atari blocked release of the game for additional platforms until it was reworked as Tempest 4000 some years later.

Clones

1980s home computer clones include Web War for the Acorn Electron and BBC Micro published by Artic Computing in 1985, Tubeway (1982) for the Apple II, Storm (1984) for the Tandy Color Computer, and Livewire!, an Atari 8-bit family type-in game printed in ANALOG Computing in 1983. The Tempest-inspired Axis Assassin (1983) was one of the first five releases from Electronic Arts.

Arashi is a 1992 freeware clone for the Apple Macintosh running classic Mac OS. Whirlwind (1994) is a commercial game that Computer Gaming World described as "a clone of Tempest".

In popular culture
Tempest is part of a plot thread in the 1984 film Night of the Comet.
Tempest is featured prominently in the music video for Rush's 1982 song "Subdivisions".
 Parzival must beat Anorak's high score of 728,329 on Tempest (1980 cabinet) in the first part of the final challenge inside the Crystal Gate in the book Ready Player One.
 In the pilot episode of the television series Numbers, Larry Fleinhardt plays Tempest while advising someone on a mathematical problem. Larry is later seen playing the game in the season four episode "End Game".
 Tempest is one of the video games in the TV comedy Silver Spoons.
 Tempest is seen in "Twilight Zone: The Movie" played by Jeremy Licht as Anthony in the Segment 3 remake of the original Episode "It's A Good Life" and later, the game's sounds can be heard when Anthony's powers fully manifest.
 Tempest is referenced by, and is believed to be a partially inspiration for the urban legend Polybius.

See also

 Golden age of video arcade games
 History of video games

References

External links

Tempest at the Arcade History database

Tempest Code Project to reconstruct and document an assembly source code version of the game

1981 video games
Arcade video games
Amstrad CPC games
Atari arcade games
Atari ST games
BBC Micro and Acorn Electron games
Cancelled Atari 2600 games
Cancelled Atari 5200 games
Fixed shooters
Superior Software games
Third-person shooters
Vector arcade video games
Video games developed in the United States
Xbox 360 Live Arcade games
ZX Spectrum games
Commercial video games with freely available source code
Vertically-oriented video games
Multiplayer and single-player video games